The Contention of Ajax and Ulysses for the Armour of Achilles is a Caroline era stage play, an interlude written by James Shirley and first published in 1659. As its title indicates, the subject of the play is a staple of the classical literature; Shirley most likely drew upon Book 13 of the Metamorphoses of Ovid as his direct source, along with Thomas Heywood's play The Iron Age.

The play was first printed in an octavo volume issued by the bookseller John Crooke, containing both The Contention and another play by Shirley, Honoria and Mammon. The title page states that The Contention was "nobly represented by young gentlemen of quality, at a private entertainment of some persons of honour." No specific data about the stage history of either piece has survived, however; both may have been works that Shirley prepared for performance by the schoolboys he taught after the theatres closed with the start of the English Civil War in 1642.

While not one of Shirley's most famous works, The Contention contains a funeral dirge that begins "The glories of our blood and state / Are shadows, not substantial things," which has been often excerpted and reproduced, sometimes under the title of "Death the Leveller." Included in collections of familiar quotations, the poem is the most famous and popular work in Shirley's canon; Louisa May Alcott quotes its concluding line in Little Women. The poem was set to music, and was well known as a song — King Charles II was reportedly fond of it.

Synopsis
The play is set in the Grecian camp outside the walls of Troy, during the Trojan War; it opens soon after the death of Achilles, with the pages of Ajax and Ulysses disputing the relative worths of their masters. The pages' dispute quickly turns into an argument, and then a fight. The fight is broken up by the entrance of Calchas, who clears away the pages for the debate that is about to occur. The Greek generals and officers, led by Agamemnon and including Menelaus, Nestor, Thersander, and Diomedes, enter and seat themselves to hear the debate; Ajax and Ulysses follow. Ajax begins, and makes long and fulsome speeches in praise of his own valor and prowess in battle; he also attacks the courage and character of his opponent. Ulysses speaks second, and is far more eloquent and perceptive, turning Ajax's bluster against him. Once the contenders withdraw, the generals decide to award Achilles' armor to Ulysses.

The play's second scene is devoted to Ajax's madness: Ajax has lost his mind as a result of his defeat to Ulysses, and eventually commits suicide. The brief final scene shows Ajax's funeral.

References

External links
 The Glories of Our Blood and State online.

English Renaissance plays
1640s plays
Masques by James Shirley
Trojan War literature
Agamemnon
Plays based on Metamorphoses